Thomas Picton Warlow Sr. House is a national historic site located at 701 Driver Avenue, Winter Park, Florida in Orange County.

Construction on the house was completed in 1927, and it was added to the National Register of Historic Places in 2009.

References

National Register of Historic Places in Orange County, Florida
Winter Park, Florida
Houses in Orange County, Florida
Houses on the National Register of Historic Places in Florida
Houses completed in 1927
1927 establishments in Florida